William Pattison Telford (October 11, 1836 – May 4, 1922) was a Canadian banker and politician.

Born in Castleton, Roxburghshire, Scotland, Telford was educated at public schools in Dumfries, Waterloo County, Sydenham, Grey County and at the Toronto Normal School. Telford spent three years in stone cutting and building, the next 14 years in teaching, holding a first class certificate at the expiration of that period, and two or three years in building operations. He then became a banker. Telford was president of the Sun Portland Cement Company and Manager of the Grey and Bruce Loan Company. He was with his regiment during the Fenian raids in 1866.

He was a member of the Owen Sound Town Council, before being elected to the House of Commons of Canada for Grey North in the 1904 federal election. A Liberal, he was defeated in 1908.

He married Margaret Couper in 1867. His son, William Pattison Telford Jr., was also a Member of Parliament.

References
 The Canadian Parliament; biographical sketches and photo-engravures of the senators and members of the House of Commons of Canada. Being the tenth Parliament, elected November 3, 1904

External links
 

1836 births
1922 deaths
Liberal Party of Canada MPs
Members of the House of Commons of Canada from Ontario
Scottish emigrants to pre-Confederation Ontario
People of the Fenian raids
Immigrants to Upper Canada